Fourteen drama CDs have been released between 2004 and 2009 for the anime and manga series Magical Girl Lyrical Nanoha written by Masaki Tsuzuki.

Magical Girl Lyrical Nanoha

Magical Girl Lyrical Nanoha Sound Stage 01
 is a drama CD first released on November 26, 2004 by King Records bearing the catalog number KICA-666. It contains sixteen tracks and covers a duration of 48:24. It features dialogue between the different characters of the anime television series Magical Girl Lyrical Nanoha and takes place between episodes two and three, with the main cast visiting the pool and Nanoha sealing a Jewel Seed while there. It also features three pieces of music entitled "Precious Time", "Kitto Stand By You", and "Flying High!" performed by Rie Kugimiya as Arisa Bannings, Ai Shimizu as Suzuka Tsukimura, and Yukari Tamura as Nanoha Takamachi respectively. It peak ranked 179th on the Oricon albums chart and remained on the chart for one week.

Magical Girl Lyrical Nanoha Sound Stage 02
 is a drama CD first released on January 13, 2005 by King Records bearing the catalog number KICA-667.  It contains nineteen tracks and covers a duration of 1:11:44. It features dialogue between Fate Testarossa, Aruf, Precia Testarossa, and Rinis that takes place between episodes five and six of the anime series Magical Girl Lyrical Nanoha. It also features three pieces of music entitled "Yasashii Yume wo Mireru Yō", "Onaji Yūki", and "Wish" performed by Masumi Asano as Rinis, Natsuko Kuwatani as Aruf, and Nana Mizuki as Fate Testarossa respectively. It peak ranked 168th on the Oricon singles chart and remained on the chart for one week.

Magical Girl Lyrical Nanoha Sound Stage 03
 is a drama CD first released on April 6, 2005 by King Records bearing the catalog number KICA-668. It contains nineteen tracks and covers a duration of 1:11:44. It features dialogue between Nanoha Takamachi, Yūno Scrya, Fate Testarossa, Aruf, and Chrono Harlaown that takes place after the conclusion of the anime series Magical Girl Lyrical Nanoha. It also features three pieces of music entitled "Egao ni Naare", "Kimi no Sora ni", and "Skyblue Graduation" performed by Yukari Tamura as Nanoha Tamachi, Kaori Mizuhashi as Yūno Scrya, and Nana Mizuki as Fate Testarossa respectively. It peak ranked 103rd on the Oricon albums chart and remained on the chart for one week.

Magical Girl Lyrical Nanoha A's

Magical Girl Lyrical Nanoha A's Sound Stage 01
 is a drama CD first released on November 23, 2005 by King Records bearing the catalog number KICA-733. It peak ranked 98th on the Oricon albums chart and remained on the chart for one week. It takes place between episodes three and four of the A's anime, and involves the heroes and the Wolkenritter visiting a public bath one evening.

Magical Girl Lyrical Nanoha A's Sound Stage 02
 is a drama CD first released on January 12, 2006 by King Records bearing the catalog number KICA-743. "Snow Rain" was featured as an insert song in episode 11 of the anime Magical Girl Lyrical Nanoha A's. It peak ranked 62nd on the Oricon albums chart and remained on the chart for three weeks. It takes place between episodes six and seven, and shows Hayate learning about the Book of Darkness' past, while Nanoha and Fate visit the TSAB main office to discuss future careers.

Magical Girl Lyrical Nanoha A's Sound Stage M
A Christmas Special CD with Nanoha and Fate.

Magical Girl Lyrical Nanoha A's Sound Stage 03
 is a drama CD first released on March 8, 2006 by King Records bearing the catalog number KICA-768. It peak ranked 52nd on the Oricon albums chart and remained on the chart for two weeks. It takes place after the main events of the last episode, and involves the TSAB and civilians going flower gazing together.

Magical Girl Lyrical Nanoha StrikerS

Magical Girl Lyrical Nanoha StrikerS Sound Stage M The StrikerS
 is a drama CD first released as part of the vol.84 of Megami Magazine on May 1, 2007. It is set before the StrikerS TV Series started.

Magical Girl Lyrical Nanoha StrikerS Sound Stage 01
 is a drama CD first released on May 23, 2007 by King Records bearing the catalog number KICA-853.  was used as an insert song in episode 8 of the anime Magical Girl Lyrical Nanoha StrikerS. It peak ranked 20th on the Oricon albums chart and remained on the chart for five weeks. It takes place at some point between the fifth and seventh episodes, and involves the main cast going on a mission to retrieve a Lost Logia on Earth.

Magical Girl Lyrical Nanoha StrikerS Sound Stage 02
 is a drama CD first released on July 18, 2007 by King Records bearing the catalog number KICA-854 It peak ranked 16th on the Oricon albums chart and remained on the chart for four weeks. It takes place between episodes 14 and 15, and mainly concerns Fate, Erio and Caro's relationship as a family.

Magical Girl Lyrical Nanoha StrikerS Sound Stage 03
 is a drama CD first released on October 3, 2007 by King Records bearing the catalog number KICA-855. It peak ranked 15th on the Oricon albums chart and remained on the chart for four weeks. It takes place between episodes 18 and 19, and involves the Riot Force Six members recovering from Scaglietti's attack while preparing for the next battle.

Magical Girl Lyrical Nanoha StrikerS Sound Stage 04
 is a drama CD first released on December 12, 2007 by King Records bearing the catalog number KICA-856. It peak ranked 24th on the Oricon albums chart and remained on the chart for four weeks. It takes place between the end of the Jail Scaglietti incident and the dissolution of Riot Force Six, and deals with the futures of the members and their former enemies.

Magical Girl Lyrical Nanoha StrikerS Sound Stage M3
Set right after StrikerS. Nanoha, Fate and Hayate now 20 years old tells what happened to them after Mobile 6 disbanded and also about the life of the other characters. Vivio who is now 7 years old is also with Nanoha, Fate and Hayate in this Special CD.

Magical Girl Lyrical Nanoha StrikerS Sound Stage M4
 is a drama CD first released as part of the vol.100 of Megami Magazine on September 1, 2008.. It takes place around two years after StrikerS, Hayate now 21 years old spends a day off together w/ her whole family. This special focuses on the Yagami Family.

Magical Girl Lyrical Nanoha StrikerS Sound Stage X
 is a drama CD first released on October 29, 2008 by King Records bearing the catalog number KICA-943. It peak ranked 14th on the Oricon albums chart and remained on the chart for five weeks. The sound stage takes place three years after StrikerS and features the characters introduced in StrikerS trying to stop a series of killings by the biological weapons known as the Marriage.

Track list
From Oricon.

Magical Girl Lyrical Nanoha The Movie 1st Drama CD
The following drama CDs were released in 2009 as a preview for Magical Girl Lyrical Nanoha The Movie 1st.

Magical Girl Lyrical Nanoha The Movie 1st Drama CD Side-N

Magical Girl Lyrical Nanoha The Movie 1st Drama CD Side-F

Magical Girl Lyrical Nanoha The Movie 2nd A's Drama CD
The following drama CDs were released in 2011 as a preview for Magical Girl Lyrical Nanoha The Movie 2nd A's

Magical Girl Lyrical Nanoha The Movie 2nd A's Drama CD Side-T

Magical Girl Lyrical Nanoha The Movie 2nd A's Drama CD Side-Y

Magical Girl Lyrical Nanoha GOD Sound Stage

Magical Girl Lyrical Nanoha GOD Sound Stage M
Magical Girl Lyrical Nanoha GOD Sound Stage M is a drama CD released on 2012. It features characters from the video game Magical Girl Lyrical Nanoha A's Portable: The Gears of Destiny meeting the versions of Nanoha and Fate from Magical Girl Lyrical Nanoha The Movie 1st.

Magical Girl Lyrical Nanoha GOD Sound Stage A
Magical Girl Lyrical Nanoha GOD Sound Stage A is a drama CD released on 2012.

References

Drama CDs